Taras Mykolayovych Boychuk (born March 17, 1966 in the village of Lukavtsi, Vyzhnytsia district, Chernivtsi region) is a Ukrainian scientist in the field of Chronobiology and Chronotoxicology, Doctor of Medical Science (1999), Professor (2002), Rector of Bukovinian State Medical University (2010), President of the Association of Bukovinian State Medical University Graduates Association of Bukovinian State Medical University Graduates(2012), Academician of the Academy of Science of the Higher School of Ukraine (2010).

Education and career
After initial graduation in 1989 from the Chernivtsi State Medical Institute, specialising in General Medicine, he went from being a senior laboratory assistant to being the head of the Water Hygiene and Water Reservoir Sanitary Control Laboratory, Medical-Ecological Problems Research Institute, a department of the Ministry of Public Health of Ukraine.  
After defending his Candidate's thesis in 1994, he was appointed to a position of an assistant. Later he became Associate Professor in the Department of Medical Biology and Genetics, a faculty of the Bukovinian State Medical Academy.

In 1999 he defended his Doctor’s Thesis. In 2002 he was appointed to a chair of Professor. Since 2000 to 2003 he was the Dean of Pediatric and Medical Faculties at the Bukovinian State Medical Academy.

During 2004-2007 he worked at the Ministry of Public Health of Ukraine as the Deputy Chief, Education and Science Bureau, Department of Personnel Policy, Education and Science. In 2007 he was appointed the Rector of Kyiv Medical University, head of the Ukrainian Association of Folk Medicine, and Chief of the Department of Normal Physiology and Medical Biology.

On April 7, 2010 he was appointed acting Rector of Bukovinian State Medical University (BSMU) by the Ukrainian Ministry of Public Health.

On November 12, 2010 during the Conference of BSMU Works Meeting he was elected as the Rector of Bukovinian State Medical University.

Boychuk's research priorities are Chronobiology, Chronotoxicology, and Laser polarimetry of biological objects. He is the author of more than 164 scientific works, including 10 educational manuals and 8 monographs. He has supervised three Candidates of Science and one Doctor of Science. He is now a scientific adviser to three doctoral candidates and two postgraduates.

He is the chief editor of the scientific-practical journals "Clinical and Experimental Pathology","Bukovinian Medical Herald", and "Neonatology, Surgery and Perinatal Medicine".

Awards
 Honourable Charter of the Ministry of Public Health of Ukraine (2000, 2005),
 Commendation of the Cabinet of Ministers of Ukraine (2004);
 Honourable Charter of the Ministry of Education and Science of Ukraine (2009),
 Y. Fedkovych Prize,
 Badge of Honour “For Education Development” (2009),
 Certificates of Chernivtsi Municipal Authority and Bukovinian State Medical Academy,
 B.L. Radzikhovsky Prize (2011); Omelian Popovych Prize (2011).

Personal life
He is married to Iryna Boychuk, with one son, Igor.

References

Sources
Website of Bukovinian State Medical University 
Website of the Ministry of Public Health of Ukraine  
Scientific biographies of Ukrainian scientists on the website of the V.I.Vernadsky National Ukrainian Library 

1966 births
Living people
Academic staff of Bukovinian State Medical University
Ukrainian pathologists
Chronobiologists
People from Vyzhnytsia